Gannan is a county in Qiqihar, in the west of Heilongjiang province, China, about  northwest of the city seat of Qiqihar and bordering Inner Mongolia to the west.

Administrative divisions 
Gannan County is divided into 5 towns and 5 townships. 
5 towns
 Gannan, Xingshisi, Pingyang, Dongyang, Jubao
5 townships
 Zhangshan, Zhongxing, Xinglong, Baoshan, Chahayang

Climate

References

Cities in Heilongjiang
Districts of Qiqihar